Valero Rivera López (born 14 February 1953) is a Spanish handball coach for the Qatari national team.

He coached the Spain men's national handball team and participated at the 2012 European Men's Handball Championship held in Serbia.

He is the father of Valero Rivera Folch.

References

Living people
Sportspeople from Zaragoza
1953 births
Spanish male handball players
FC Barcelona Handbol players
Liga ASOBAL players
Spanish handball coaches
Spanish expatriate sportspeople in Qatar
Handball coaches of international teams